Sophie el Goulli (4 February 1932 – 10 October 2015) was a Tunisian writer and art historian.

She was born in Sousse and was educated at the Sorbonne. El Goulli worked for the Tunisian Ministry of Culture and taught art history at the University of Tunis. She also has contributed to the cinematic arts journal SeptièmArt. She retired in 1993, and moved to Tunis. She died on 10 October 2015.

El Gouilli established the Tunisian film library. She received the Prix Culturel du Cinéma in 1991 and the Prix national de la Critique in 1992.

Selected works 
 Signes, poetry (1973)
 Ammar Farhat, monograph (1979)
 Nos rêves, poetry for children (1980)
 Vertige solaire, poetry (1981)
 Les mystères de Tunis, novel (1993)
 Peinture en Tunisie, art history (1994)

References 

1932 births
20th-century Tunisian poets
Tunisian novelists
Tunisian women poets
2015 deaths
People from Sousse
Tunisian writers in French
20th-century Tunisian women writers
20th-century Tunisian writers
21st-century Tunisian women writers
21st-century Tunisian writers
21st-century Tunisian poets